Melbourne Film Festival may refer to:

 Melbourne International Film Festival
 Melbourne Underground Film Festival
 Melbourne Queer Film Festival